Renmore is a suburb of Galway City, Ireland, situated approximately 2 km to the east of the city. Renmore runs east along the coast and south of Dublin Road, from the shore of Lough Atalia on its west side to Lurgan Park on its east. The area houses approximately 5,000 people and includes Ballyloughane beach, which also has camping facilities.

Amenities
Lough Atalia lies between Renmore and the city, which can be crossed using the public path beside the railway line (widely known as 'the line'). St Oliver Plunkett Church is located beside the local national (primary) school.  The primary school in Renmore is known as Scoil Chaitriona, and there is also an all-Irish gaelscoil named Gaelscoil Dara. Galway-Mayo Institute of Technology is one of the larger employers in the area.

Renmore is also home to Dún Uí Mhaoilíosa (meaning "Mellow's Fort" and named for Liam Mellows), a base of the Irish Army's Southern Brigade. The barracks, also officially and commonly known as "Renmore Barracks" in English, was the base to the Connaught Rangers under British rule. The barracks are now the base of the 1st Infantry Battalion and located at the end of Renmore Road. The Department of Defence also has offices in the area.

A private hospital, the Bon Secours Hospital, Galway which is operated by the Bon Secours Health System, is located in Renmore.

Events 
The Renmore Panto is an annual pantomime which began in 1979 and the first performance was on the stage in the Jes Hall. The panto has been hosted by a variety of venues including Leisureland and the Town Hall Theatre.

See also
 List of towns and villages in Ireland

References

Geography of Galway (city)
Connaught Rangers